= Hunshikatti =

- Village
- Location in Karnataka, India Hunshikatti (India)
- Coordinates: 15°42′N 74°45′E
- Country: India
- State: Karnataka
- District: Belgaum

Languages
  - Official: Kannada
- Time zone: UTC+5:30 (IST)
- Postal code: 591153

Hunshikatti is a village in Belgaum district in the southern state of Karnataka, India.
